Antonio Rocco Caponigro (January 22, 1912 – April 18, 1980), also known as Tony Bananas, was the consigliere of Angelo Bruno in the Philadelphia crime family.  He is known for ending the peaceful Bruno regime by ordering his murder over a dispute concerning the methamphetamine trade.

Early life
Caponigro was born in Chicago, Illinois in 1912.  He operated in the Ironbound neighborhood of Newark, New Jersey. As a made member of the Philadelphia crime family in the 1950s and 1960s, he became a recognized crime figure after being identified by mob turncoat Joseph Valachi in 1963. During that time he served under capo Riccardo Biondi. He was the son of a wealthy banana merchant who owned and managed a stand at the Italian Market, otherwise known as the South 9th Street Curb Market.

He lived in Short Hills, New Jersey. He had a wife, Kathleen, who died in 1991. He also had a half sister, Susan, who had a daughter out of wedlock by the name of Teresa. Susan Caponigro married Alfred Salerno.

Rise to power
He rose in rank to become the consigliere during the 1970s. Caponigro foresaw the end of the peaceful Angelo Bruno regime and decided to hasten it. Indictments for racketeering were being brought against the ailing Bruno, and there was no leadership in the methamphetamine industry. Caponigro knew that he could count on the support of several key members of Bruno's administration after the don died. 

Accordingly, Caponigro traveled to New York City to consult his friend Frank Tieri, from the Genovese crime family. Caponigro controlled a lucrative numbers operation in Newark, a holdover from the 1960s when the New York families had ceded parts of North Jersey to the Philadelphia crime family. Tieri also had activities in the area, and he had challenged Caponigro's incursion. Caponigro appealed the territorial dispute to The Commission, which, acting on Bruno's recommendation, ruled in favor of Caponigro. Caponigro approached Tieri with a plan to murder Bruno and take over the Philadelphia crime family. Tieri assured Caponigro that he would support him before the Commission. He returned to Philadelphia believing that his planned coup was now officially sanctioned. He recruited the support of his brother-in-law Alfred Salerno (no relation to mob turncoat Joseph Salerno or mob front boss Anthony Salerno) and Bruno regime capos John Simone and Frank Sindone, and ordered the assassination.

Death
Bruno was shotgunned to death while his driver, John Stanfa, was wounded while they were parked outside Bruno's Philadelphia home on March 21, 1980. When the Commission learned of Bruno's murder, Caponigro was summoned at once. He was told that the murder had not been considered, let alone sanctioned, by the Commission. He turned helplessly to Frank Tieri, who sat in on the meeting. When he identified Tieri as the man who had authorized the murder, Tieri categorically denied it. The Commission ruled that Caponigro had murdered a Commission member without authorization. On April 18, 1980, Caponigro and his brother-in-law, Alfred Salerno, were found dead, battered and nude in the trunk of a car in The Bronx.

Aftermath
The death of Angelo Bruno, his consigliere, and two capos threw the Philadelphia crime family wide open. With New York's blessing, Angelo Bruno's surviving underboss, Phil Testa, was appointed the new boss. After Caponigro murdered Bruno, Scarfo could return from his appointed exile in Atlantic City, New Jersey. Testa appointed narcotics trafficker Peter Casella as underboss and Nicky Scarfo as consigliere.

See also
List of unsolved murders

References

Further reading
 The Plumber: The True Story of How One Good Man Destroyed the Entire Philadelphia Mafia by Joseph Salerno and Stephen J. Rivele
 Gangland International: The Mafia and other Mobs by James Morton
 East End Gangland and Gangland International Omnibus by James Morton

External links 
Profile
Antonio (Tony Bananas) Caponigro -Find A Grave

 

1912 births
1980 deaths
1980 murders in the United States
Consiglieri
Deaths by firearm in the Bronx
Male murder victims
Murdered American gangsters of Italian descent
People from Millburn, New Jersey
People from New Jersey
People murdered by the Genovese crime family
People murdered in New York City
Philadelphia crime family
Unsolved murders in the United States